Tobias Swärd (born Tobias Oscar Robert Svärd, 8 October 1986 in Eskilstuna) is a Swedish actor known for his role as Berra in Kan du vissla Johanna?

References

External links 

1986 births
Living people
People from Eskilstuna
Swedish male child actors
Swedish male voice actors